Back to the 80s may refer to:

 Back to the 80s (musical), a 2004 stage musical
 "Back to the 80s" (song), a song by Aqua